Winterville were an English blues rock band, whose sound was influenced by the 1960s Blues sound of bands like Cream, and the 1990s Grunge sound of bands like Soundgarden. They released several singles and one album.

When the band formed in 2003, they were named "The Others", under which they released their first EP. With the emergence of another band of the same name (see The Others (band)), the name was changed to "The Keytones". Again, another band had the name, so the band settled on the name "Winterville". There is also an Australian artist of the same name, but neither act has taken any steps to change their name.

Formation

Though Peter Shoulder played live shows with several different acts before Winterville, he didn't release any recordings until he met bassist Joss Clapp and the Belgian  drummer Mario Goossens. Both had other bands at the time, but when Peter came to them with material in September 2003, the band went into rehearsals at Northern Recordings in Consett, County Durham, which was the first time they played together. They then moved to Chapel Studios in Lincolnshire, where they began work recording songs for The Others EP, which was to be their first commercial release.

Career

In late 2003, Winterville played their first live shows as the support for the long-standing British blues-rock act, Thunder. They then went on to play their own gigs at smaller venues. In March 2004 the band played as part of the South by Southwest music festival in Austin, Texas, where they were received very favourably. At the start of 2005, Thin Lizzy guitarist Scott Gorham personally requested that Winterville support his band on their tour. Touring with such well-established artists as Thunder and Thin Lizzy helped Winterville reach an audience greatly appropriate to their musical style and thus enlarge their fanbase.

In early 2005, Shoulder collaborated with blues artist, Little Milton, on what was to be his final album, Think of Me. He wrote "Thinking of you", "Second hand love" and "Gonna find me somebody to love". He also played lead and rhythm guitar on all three tracks. At the 2006 Blues Music Awards, "Thinking of You" won the Best Song Award.

In between these tours, Winterville released The Fallout Sessions EP, their first single "Shotgun Smile", and its follow-up "Under My Skin". Their debut album, Everything in Moderation was released on 14 November 2005, and a third single from the album, "Breathe" followed. The band performed at the Download Festival in 2006.

Split 
On Wednesday 3 January 2007, all information and features on Winterville's official website were removed and replaced with a single page displaying the following message:

The split was extremely sudden and the reason is still unknown amongst fans. The band were in the process of working on material for their second album.

Singer and guitarist Peter Shoulder had been working on solo material, but proceeded to the band The Union with former rock band Thunder co-songwriter and lead guitarist, Luke Morley.

Drummer Mario Goossens returned to Belgium and became successful as the drummer of Triggerfinger. Goossens already played in  Hooverphonic and the Flemish bands Noordkaap and Monza (band). He also produced the first album of The Blackbox Revelation, "Set Your Head on Fire",  two albums of the post-metal/sludge metal band Steak Number Eight and also the self-titled debut of the indie band Team William.

Discography

References

External links
Official Website
MySpace Page
Peter Shoulder's MySpace Page
The Union Official Website

British post-grunge groups
British blues musical groups
English blues rock musical groups